Khetovo is a rural locality (a settlement) and the administrative center of Morzhegorskoye Rural Settlement of Vinogradovsky District, Arkhangelsk Oblast, Russia. The population was 454 as of 2010. There are 9 streets.

Geography 
Khetovo is located on the Severnaya Dvina River, 33 km northwest of Bereznik (the district's administrative centre) by road.

References 

Rural localities in Vinogradovsky District